The 1965 SFR Yugoslavia Chess Championship was the 20th edition of SFR Yugoslav Chess Championship. Held in Novi Sad, SFR Yugoslavia, SR Serbia, SAP Vojvodina, between 7th Februaruy and 6 March 1965. The tournament was won by Milan Matulović

References

External links 
 http://www.perpetualcheck.com/show/show.php?lan=cp&data=Y1965001&job=g1
 https://www.partizanopedia.rs/1965%20sah.html

Yugoslav Chess Championships
1965 in chess
Chess